K. V. Ushashri Charan is a  cabinet minister from  Andhra Pradesh, India. She is a leader of the YSR Congress party. She is present  MLA of Kalyandurg constituency of Anantapur district.

Career 
Earlier she worked as Telugu Desam Party state general secretary of Women's wing. In December 2014, she resigned from this post and joined YSR Congress Party. In 2019 assembly elections she contested from Kalyandurg, won as MLA defeating Uma Maheshwar Naidu of TDP party with 19896 majority. In April 2022 during Cabinet reshuffle she was appointed  Minister for women, children, differently-abled individuals, and senior citizen welfare.

References

People from Anantapur district
Living people
Andhra Pradesh MLAs 2019–2024
YSR Congress Party politicians
People from Rayalaseema
1976 births